Fabio Menta is an Italian coach and former player who last coached the Foton Tornadoes which competed as the Foton Pilipinas at the 2016 Asian Women's Club Volleyball Championship.

Menta has also coached the women's national team of the Cook Islands. He was hired by the Foton Tornadoes in August 2016 to lead them at the 2016 Asian Women's Club Volleyball Championship where they competed as "Foton Pilipinas". Menta led Foton at the  2016 Select Tuna Thailand Volleyball Championship, which was part of the club's preparation for the Asian club stint.

He resigned from Foton on 24 September 2016.

References

1962 births
Living people
People from Syracuse, Sicily
Italian volleyball coaches
Italian men's volleyball players
Expatriate sportspeople in the Cook Islands
Italian expatriate sportspeople in the Philippines
Sportspeople from the Province of Syracuse